Kauê (born August 19, 1983), full name Kauê Caetano da Silva, is a former Brazilian football player.

External links
 

1983 births
Living people
Brazilian footballers
Brazilian expatriate footballers
Brazilian expatriate sportspeople in Turkey
Expatriate footballers in Turkey
Ituano FC players
Sport Club Internacional players
ABC Futebol Clube players
Grêmio Barueri Futebol players
Fortaleza Esporte Clube players
Konyaspor footballers
Süper Lig players
Association football midfielders